Giorgos Tanidis (25 December 1946 – 3 June 2016) was a Greek professional footballer who played as a center back and a later manager.

Club career
Tanidis was born and raised in Ptolemaida where he started playing football at the local club, Aris Ptolemaidas. With the club of Ptolemaida, the tough central defender distinguished himself in the championship of the second division and in the summer of 1971 he was transferred to the then champion, AEK Athens.

He made his debut with the yellow-blacks on 21 November 1971, in a 4–0 victory over Iraklis at home. He played for AEK for three seasons, while he also managed to make 2 appearances in the UEFA Cup. One on 27 September 1972 in the away 1–1 draw against Salgótarján and the other in the 3–0 against Liverpool at Anfield, on 24 October 1972.

Ιn the summer of 1974, he transferred to Panachaiki, where he played for a season and then he moved to Rodos. He played with the "deers" until 1980, when he ended his career as a football player, having managed to celebrate a promotion to the first division in 1978, where he played 2 more seasons.

Managerial career
Tanidis stayed permanently with his family in Rhodes, where he coached several teams such as Rodos, Diagoras, Ialysos and Apollon Kalythies among others.

Personal life
While he worked as a coach, Tanidis also worked at PPC and later as an entrepreneur. He was a member of the veterans' association of AEK and was often present at their events, with his last "football" presence being the friendly match in Karpathos with the local Posidonas Karpathos in the summer of 2006. On 15 January 2015, Tanidis came into the news again after an incident created at a pre-election event of Syriza in Rhodes, when he and his two sons protested strongly about the problems created by the Municipal Authority of Filadelfeia-Chalkidona in the construction of the new stadium of AEK. He died on 3 July 2016 after facing serious health issues, at the age of 69.

Honours

Rodos
Beta Ethniki: 1977–78

References

1946 births
2016 deaths
Greek footballers
Super League Greece players
AEK Athens F.C. players
Panachaiki F.C. players
Rodos F.C. players
Association football defenders
Footballers from Ptolemaida